Women's slalom skiing events at the 2002 Winter Paralympics were contested at Snowbasin.

There were 5 events covering 10 disability classes. Final standings were decided by applying a disability factor to the actual times achieved.

Visually Impaired
There was one event under the visually impaired classification.

B2-3
B2 – visually impaired: up to ca 3-5% functional vision
B3 – visually impaired: under 10% functional vision

Sitting
There were two events under the sitting classification.

LW10-12
LW 10 – sitting: paraplegia with no or some upper abdominal function and no functional sitting balance
LW 11 – sitting: paraplegia with fair functional sitting balance
LW 12 – sitting: double leg amputation above the knees, or paraplegia with some leg function and good sitting balance

Standing
There were 3 events under the standing classification.

LW2
LW2 – standing: single leg amputation above the knee

LW3, 4, 9
LW3 – standing: double leg amputation below the knee, mild cerebral palsy, or equivalent impairment
LW4 – standing: single leg amputation below the knee
LW9 – standing: amputation or equivalent impairment of one arm and one leg

LW6/8
LW6/8 – standing: single arm amputation

References

W